The Americus Times-Recorder is a daily newspaper published in Americus, Georgia. It is operated by South Georgia Media Group, a division of Community Newspaper Holdings Inc.

History
In 1879, The Americus Recorder began as a tri-weekly publication owned by Merrel Callaway. The Americus Recorder was a competitor of the Sumter Republican newspaper at this time. A few years later, Calloway sold his interest in the Americus Recorder and the Americus Times was then officially established in 1890. While both were successful, the town could not afford to have both the Times and the Recorder, so they combined both of the newspaper titles in 1891 when Captain Bascom Myrick made the name the Americus Times Recorder. 

Col. Meyrick became manager and editor of the Americus Times. His wife, Marie Louise Scudder Myrick, is said to be the first woman "in the South" to own and edit a newspaper.

Thomson Newspapers bought the Times-Recorder in 1984; Community Newspaper Holdings bought the paper in 2000 when Thomson decided to leave the newspaper business.

References

External links 
 Times-Recorder Website
 CNHI Website

Americus
Americus Times-Recorder